Jon Wellner (born July 11, 1975) is an American actor, best known for his role as toxicologist Henry Andrews on CSI: Crime Scene Investigation. He has portrayed Andrews through the 2014–2015 season, his 10th with the show.

He began his affiliation with the show in Season 4 as a researcher, verifying that the information on the show was accurate. He had a role as a zookeeper in Season 5, then took on the role of Andrews. He continues to serve as a researcher for the show. In 2009 he and fellow cast member/researcher David Berman formed a company that does research for several other television forensics shows including Bones, CSI: Miami, and Drop Dead Diva.

Filmography

References

External links

1975 births
Living people
Male actors from Evanston, Illinois
American male television actors